The Battle of Humen-Shijing was fought on November 18, 1927 between the supporters of Li Jishen and Zhang Fakui within the Guangdong Army. It was the first of many internal conflicts within the Kuomintang and China in the aftermath of Chiang Kai-shek's successes in the Northern Expedition.

Bibliography
中華民國國防大學編，《中國現代軍事史主要戰役表》

Conflicts in 1927
Conflicts in Guangdong
Conflicts in Guangzhou